Lohi Bher Awan Islamabad is a populated village  in Islamabad, Pakistan. It has the Lohi Bher Wildlife Park. Many people are AWAN"QUTAB SHAHI AWAN". This Village is about 200 years old.it is huge village in area of Islamabad.There are many housing societies in land area of lohibher i.e PWD, PAKISTANTOWN, JINNAH GARDEN, CAPITAL ENCLAVE, SOAN GARDEN.It is situated infront of Pwd Housing society

References 

Union councils of Islamabad Capital Territory
Villages in Islamabad Capital Territory